Ralf Kellermann (born 24 September 1968) is a German former football player and manager who serves as the sporting director for Wolfsburg women.

He was appointed to the coaching position in summer 2008 and in 2011 his contract was extended until 2014, finishing duties in 2017.

Coaching
With Wolfsburg he won the treble in 2013: the Bundesliga, the DFB-Cup and the UEFA Women's Champions League.

References

External links
 
 Profile at VfL Wolfsburg

1968 births
Living people
German footballers
MSV Duisburg players
Sportfreunde Siegen players
SC Paderborn 07 players
SC Verl players
FSV Frankfurt players
2. Bundesliga players
VfL Wolfsburg managers
VfL Wolfsburg (women) managers
German football managers
Association football goalkeepers
SV Lippstadt 08 players
Footballers from Duisburg